Live from the UK Sept./2006 is the first live album by Canadian rock band Billy Talent, released through Concertlive.co.uk. It was available for purchase at the concerts that they were recorded live at, but alternatively could be pre-ordered.

Track listing

CD One – London Hammersmith Palais – September 8, 2006

CD two – Manchester Academy – September 16, 2006 

Live From The UK September 2006
2006 live albums